Calluga longispinata is a moth in the  family Geometridae.

References

Moths described in 1907
Eupitheciini